Dewford may refer to:

 Dewford town, in the Pokémon franchise
 Dewey Duck, full name Dewford Deuteronomy Dingus Turbo Duck